William Augustus Whittlesey (July 14, 1796 – November 6, 1866) was an American lawyer and politician who served one term as a U.S. Representative from Ohio from 1849 to 1851. He was the nephew of Elisha Whittlesey.

Biography 
Born in Danbury, Connecticut, Whittlesey attended the common schools and was graduated from Yale College in 1816.
He was a tutor at the college.
He moved to Canfield, Ohio, in 1818.
He studied law at Canfield with Elisha Whittlesey, and later studied with Joshua Reed Giddings.
He was admitted to the bar in 1821 and commenced practice in Canfield.
He moved to Marietta, Ohio, in 1821.
Auditor of Washington County 1825–1837.
He served as member of the State house of representatives in 1839 and 1840.
In 1841 he formed a partnership with Charles B. Goddard of Zanesville.

Congress 
Whittlesey was elected as a Democrat to the Thirty-first Congress (March 4, 1849 – March 3, 1851).
He did not seek renomination in 1850.

Later career and death 
He resumed the practice of law.
He served as mayor of Marietta in 1856, 1860, and 1862.
He died in Brooklyn, New York, where he had gone for medical treatment, on November 6, 1866.
He was interred in Mound Cemetery, Marietta, Ohio.

Whittlesey was married to Jane Hobby, October 25, 1838. They had four children. Mrs. Whittlesey died February 10, 1896, at the home of her daughter in St. Cloud, Minnesota.

References

Sources

1796 births
1866 deaths
Yale College alumni
Politicians from Marietta, Ohio
Mayors of places in Ohio
Democratic Party members of the Ohio House of Representatives
Ohio lawyers
Burials at Mound Cemetery (Marietta, Ohio)
19th-century American politicians
People from Canfield, Ohio
19th-century American lawyers
Democratic Party members of the United States House of Representatives from Ohio